Harpalus alexeevi is a species of ground beetle in the subfamily Harpalinae. It was described by Kataev in 1990.

References

alexeevi
Beetles described in 1990